A Night at the Velvet Lounge Made in Chicago 2007 is an album by American jazz saxophonist Fred Anderson which, despite its title,  was recorded live in Poznań, Poland, at the second Made in Chicago Festival, and released by Estrada Poznańska, a small Polish cultural arts agency. Anderson is accompanied by bassist Harrison Bankhead and 8 Bold Souls drummer Dushun Mosley.

Reception

In an article for the Chicago Reader Bill Meyer notes that "Mosley's shifts between relaxed swing and edgy funk keep his partners on their toes, and the CD's high point comes when his lively calypso beat on 'Gin and Bourbon Street' prompts Anderson to channel his inner Sonny Rollins." A reviewer for The Free Jazz Collective wrote: "here is another excellent Fred Anderson album... You can not but admire the man. His love of music is truly contagious. Impossible to listen to this without enjoying it too!"

Track listing
All compositions by Anderson / Bankhead / Mosley
 "Juke Box Jazz" - 16:09
 "Clearing the Air / Me We" - 10:42
 "Gin and Bourbon Street" - 9:07
 "Africa" - 10:27
 "Trying to Cath the Rabbit" - 12:51
 "Funky Fred" - 8:34
 "The Strut" - 9:21

Personnel
Fred Anderson - tenor sax
Harrison Bankhead - bass
Dushun Mosley - drums

References

2009 live albums
Fred Anderson (musician) live albums